The 2001 United States Open Championship was the 101st U.S. Open, held June 14–18  at Southern Hills Country Club in Tulsa, Oklahoma.  The U.S. Open returned to Southern Hills for the first time since 1977. Retief Goosen won the first of his two U.S. Open titles in an 18-hole Monday playoff, two strokes ahead of runner-up Mark Brooks. The tournament was also notable for ending defending champion Tiger Woods' run of four consecutive major championship wins, the "Tiger Slam;" he finished seven strokes back in a tie for twelfth. Woods reclaimed the U.S. Open title the following year, and won the PGA Championship at Southern Hills in 2007.

The total purse was $5 million with a winner's share of $900,000. 

At the end of the final round on Sunday, Brooks three-putted his way out of the lead on the 72nd hole. In the final pairing, co-leaders Goosen and Stewart Cink both had approach shots from the 18th fairway. Goosen had  for birdie, but also three-putted to tie Brooks, forcing the next-day playoff.

Previous majors at Southern Hills 
This U.S. Open was the third at Southern Hills and its sixth major championship. Former Open  champions were Tommy Bolt in 1958, and Hubert Green in 1977.The course also previously hosted the PGA Championship in 1970, 1982, and 1994, all played in August, and later hosted the 2007 event.

Course layout 
Southern Hills Country Club

Lengths of the course in previous major championships:
, par 70 - 1994 PGA Championship
, par 70 - 1982 PGA Championship
, par 70 - 1977 U.S. Open
, par 70 - 1970 PGA Championship
, par 70 - 1958 U.S. Open

Past champions in the field

Made the cut

Missed the cut

Round summaries

First round 
Thursday, June 14, 2001
Friday, June 15, 2001

Severe thunderstorms halted play Thursday afternoon with only 66 players completing their rounds.  South Africa's Goosen completed an opening round of 66, four-under-par, to lead the way.  Goosen resumed his unfinished round at three-under-par and raced to six-under, but bogeys at the 16th and 17th took the edge off his round.  However, it was enough to earn him a one-stroke lead over three-time champion Hale Irwin and Canadian Mike Weir with tour journeyman J. L. Lewis one stroke further back.  Irwin, age 56, won his last U.S. Open title in 1990; he capped his opening 67 (−3) with a birdie at the treacherous par-four 18th. Woods could only manage a first round of 74 (+4), eight shots off the lead.  He bogeyed the ninth, before recording his first birdie of the round at the 15th.  But even that could not spark a revival in his fortunes as he bogeyed the last.

Second round 
Friday, June 15, 2001
Saturday, June 16, 2001

The delay created by Thursday's thunderstorms meant 33 players could not finish the second round on Friday, and had to play Saturday morning.  The cut line was 146 (+6) with 79 players making the cut.  Brooks fired a 64 (−6) Friday to grab a share of the lead. Goosen, who led after the first round was completed Friday morning, and Lewis joined Brooks at 136 (−4). Sergio García and Stewart Cink were tied for fourth at two-under par.  Phil Mickelson and David Duval, players who briefly flirted with the lead during Woods' run at the Masters in April, were knotted at 139 (−1) after each posted 69 on Friday.  Woods shot a 71 for 145 (+5), one stroke ahead of the cut.

Amateurs: Molder (+6), Harris (+13), Quinney (+15).

Third round 
Saturday, June 16, 2001

Cink finished with a three-under 67 and a share of the third-round lead with Goosen.  One of three leaders at the start of the day, Goosen parred each of the last nine holes despite a number of wayward shots down the stretch.  The 32-year-old South African managed a 69 to push the leading total to 205 (−5). Brooks, a co-leader of Goosen's after a tournament-low 64 on Friday, shot even-par 70 to join Rocco Mediate and García in third place at 206 (−4).  Mickelson, who ended the day three under, was the first big name to make a charge in the third round. Woods shot a 69 for 214 (+4), nine strokes back in tie for 23rd.

Final round 
Sunday, June 17, 2001

Goosen missed a  par putt at the 72nd hole to fall back into a tie with Brooks, forcing an 18-hole playoff on Monday. Brooks was in the clubhouse when Goosen charged his  birdie putt past the cup. Goosen, after watching his playing partner and co-leader Cink miss a  putt for bogey, pushed his short par putt by the right edge of the cup. He then sank a short bogey putt to finish regulation alongside Brooks at four-under-par 276. When Goosen and Cink dialed it up to go to five-under, Brooks responded by two-putting for birdie at the par-five 13th. The lead was his after Cink drove into a creek for bogey at 13 and Goosen suffered his first three-putt of the championship at the 14th. Goosen, who stoically battled to hold on to a piece of the top spot all week, knocked his approach at the 15th to the back fringe and rolled in a 12-footer to return to minus-five with Brooks. Brooks'  approach to 18 landed  left of the right-side pin placement. His first putt was too hard and sped  past the hole, and his par try stopped on the right edge. The bogey gave Brooks an even-par 70 and dropped him to four-under. Back at 17, Cink replaced Brooks as co-leader after a brilliant wedge approach over the flag landed past the pin before spinning back to two feet for birdie.

Two players who had been expected to make a charge in the final round - Mickelson and García - blew their chances with poor displays. The most eye-catching performances of the day came from Vijay Singh and Tom Kite, who both stormed to 64 (−6) - the best rounds of the week - and Olin Browne, who sank a hole-in-one at the 11th. Woods, winner of the previous four major championships, failed to make a charge on Sunday and saw his run come to an end. He turned in his second straight 69 to finish seven strokes back, tied for 12th at 283 (+3), snapping streaks of eight straight top-10s in majors and 40 consecutive events under par.

Amateurs: Molder (+8).

Scorecard
Final round

Cumulative tournament scores, relative to par
{|class="wikitable" span = 50 style="font-size:85%;
|-
|style="background: Pink;" width=10|
|Birdie
|style="background: PaleGreen;" width=10|
|Bogey
|style="background: Green;" width=10|
|Double bogey
|}
Source:

Playoff 
Monday, June 18, 2001

In the 18-hole playoff, Brooks birdied the third hole and Goosen the sixth to pull even at one-under par. Brooks bogeyed the seventh and again at the ninth, while Goosen birdied it to go three strokes up at the turn. Brooks bogeyed #10 while Goosen birdied to take a five-shot lead with eight holes to be played. They halved the next six holes, all pars except bogeys at #12, and Goosen maintained his five-stroke lead with just two holes remaining.

A two-shot swing in Brooks' favor at the 17th cut the lead to three, but Brooks, who struggled off the tee all day, sent his final drive into the right-hand rough. He chose a fairway wood for his approach and did well to run his ball into the bunker short and left of the final green. Goosen found the 18th fairway with his drive, then hit a five-iron that landed short of the green and rolled  back down the slope. Taking no chances with his tight uphill lie, Goosen used a putter to knock his ball onto the putting surface, leaving  for his par. Brooks blasted out of the trap to three feet and converted for par for a two-over 72. Goosen cautiously left his par putt  short, then rolled in the clinching putt for an even-par 70 and became just the sixth foreign-born winner of the U.S. Open in the last 70 years. Goosen became the third South African to win the title, joining Gary Player and Ernie Els as champions of the USGA's premier event.

Scorecard

{|class="wikitable" span = 50 style="font-size:85%;
|-
|style="background: Pink;" width=10|
|Birdie
|style="background: PaleGreen;" width=10|
|Bogey 
|}
Source:

Quotes 

"It's amazing and I don't want to consider what it would have felt like if I had lost but I played solid and my putter was warm in places – except yesterday." – Retief Goosen

"It's been a long week, it feels like a year out here." – Retief Goosen

"When I got up this morning, I was more comfortable than I was Sunday morning.  I knew I had a 50 percent chance of winning." – Retief Goosen

"I got punished severely in the rough today and that was kind of the difference," – Mark Brooks after his playoff loss.

"I started hitting the ball a lot better a few weeks ago, and just the putter wasn't working.  And putting a new putter in the bag last week, it just helped." – Retief Goosen

"To be honest with you I played as hard as I could, I tried on every shot, and there's no regrets." – Tiger Woods after failing to win his fifth straight major championship

"I don't think people really understand how difficult it is on you to keep putting yourself there and the stress it puts on you coming down the back nine on Sunday with a chance to win.  More times than not it wears you out."'' – Tiger Woods

"It's certainly not the finish I would have liked, but out of playing (36) majors now, and not winning any, I'm tired of beating myself up time after time," – Phil Mickelson.

"It was really tough to dig in and concentrate on that second putt because I really didn't think it was really all that important," – Stewart Cink after missing a two-foot putt which ultimately would have put him in the playoff with Goosen and Brooks (since Goosen missed his own two-foot putt seconds later).

References

External links 
USOpen.com – 2001
Goosen Takes US Open Title – BBC Sports
Goosen wins the US Open in playoff – Golf Today
Coverage on European Tour's official site
2001 U.S. Open Results - Infoplease

U.S. Open (golf)
Golf in Oklahoma
Sports in Tulsa, Oklahoma
U.S. Open
U.S. Open (golf)
U.S. Open
U.S. Open (golf)